Robert A. Levy (born 1941) is the chairman of the American libertarian Cato Institute as well as a director of the Institute of Justice, and the organizer and financier behind District of Columbia v. Heller, as well as Heller's co-counsel, in the U.S. Supreme Court Case that established the Second Amendment to the United States Constitution as affirming an individual right to gun ownership. He is a Cato senior fellow and an author and pundit.  Before becoming a lawyer, he was the founder and CEO of CDA Investment Technologies. Levy is the founder of The Robert A. Levy Fellowship in Law and Liberty which encourages talented scholars to pursue a JD degree at Antonin Scalia Law School, George Mason University.

Early life and education
Levy was born and grew up working class in the Petworth neighborhood in Washington, D.C. His parents ran a small hardware store. He attended college at American University, where he later earned a Ph.D. in business in 1966. He later attended George Mason School of Law, where he received his JD in 1994.

Financial career
After graduating he moved to Silver Spring, MD and founded CDA Investment Technologies.  CDA was a provider of financial information and software.  The company became a success and grew to have offices in Rockville, MD, New York City, Chicago, San Francisco, Tokyo and London.  It was particularly well known for its rankings of how mutual funds performed.  Their quarterly release of rankings would prompt articles in The New York Times and The Wall Street Journal.

Levy sold the company in 1986 to Dutch publishing firm Elsevier for an undisclosed amount.  In 1987 Elsevier sold CDA to The Thomson Corporation for a profit.  Levy stayed on as CEO through both sales, retiring from his position in 1991 to attend law school.

Shift to law
In 1991 Levy retired from CDA Investment Technologies and entered George Mason University School of Law, where he graduated as class valedictorian.  After graduation he clerked first for Judge Royce C. Lamberth on the United States District Court for the District of Columbia and then for Judge Douglas H. Ginsburg on the United States Court of Appeals for the District of Columbia Circuit.

Scholar, pundit, and author
In 1997 Levy became a senior fellow in constitutional studies at the Cato Institute and an adjunct professor of law at Georgetown University.  At this point Levy began writing extensively, and the following years saw him publishing articles and Op-Ed pieces in The New York Times, The Wall Street Journal, USA Today, The Washington Post, National Review, Reason and many other publications.  He also began making television and radio appearances, and has appeared on cable and network shows including Nightline, Crossfire, The O'Reilly Factor, Hardball with Chris Matthews, and The Today Show.

In 2004, Levy retired from his position at Georgetown and moved down to Naples, Florida. He remains a senior fellow at the Cato Institute. He was named to the institute's board of directors in 2007, and became chairman in 2008. He also sits on the boards of the Institute for Justice and the Foundation for Government Accountability.

Selected publications

References

External links

 Robert A. Levy Biography, Cato Institute
 

1941 births
Living people
American gun rights activists
American libertarians
American male non-fiction writers
American political commentators
American political writers
Kogod School of Business alumni
Antonin Scalia Law School alumni
Cato Institute people
American chief executives of financial services companies